Sable Island Aerodrome, is located on Sable Island, Nova Scotia, Canada. The term aerodrome is somewhat of a misnomer since there is no actual airport infrastructure nor is there a runway on Sable Island.  The designated landing area is the hard sand of the island's south beach. It has been registered as an aerodrome (and therefore has an entry as such in the Canada Flight Supplement) in order to facilitate approval of a GPS approach.  Sable Aviation operates a Britten-Norman Islander that makes regular flights to the beach from Halifax Stanfield International Airport; it is the contracted fixed wing service provider for Sable Island.

Prior permission is required to land at this aerodrome. Prior to aircraft landing or taking off, the Operations Coordinator of Parks Canada's Sable Island Station must thoroughly inspect the area in use that day to ensure that it is not too soft. This is accomplished by driving a Jeep up and down the length of the landing area, thereby marking out the "runway". Too much rain will render the sand too mushy to safely land the aircraft; conversely, in the summer, the sand may dry out to such an extent that the area becomes too soft. 

Although the south beach is not tidal, storm surges occasionally flood the entire landing area to a depth of more than a foot, rendering it unusable for fixed-wing operations.

Sable Island Station helipad
With prior permission from Parks Canada, rotary aircraft (helicopters) can operate from the Sable Island Station helipad .

References

Registered aerodromes in Nova Scotia
Aerodrome